Gotham Girls is an American Flash animated web series focusing on several of the female characters of Gotham City, produced jointly by Warner Bros. Animation and Noodle Soup Productions. The web series, which ran from 2000 to 2002, starred Harley Quinn, Poison Ivy, Batgirl, Catwoman, Renee Montoya and Zatanna in short stories of varying length about the daily lives of the characters. It takes place in the DC Animated Universe, with Arleen Sorkin, Diane Pershing, Adrienne Barbeau, Tara Strong, and Bob Hastings reprising their roles from Batman the Animated Series and The New Batman Adventures.

It is also the name of a related comic book series.

Flash animation series 

Gotham Girls is one of the few series of Flash animations made by a professional publisher of mainstream cartoons, and features professional voice-acting by the same actresses and actors as those who voiced the television series. Its use of Flash (and also vector graphics) enables the animation to appear undistorted and unpixellated at any resolution. However, the episodes do not tend to show the Symbols (the pieces used to create the flash) outside of the intended viewing area. For example, in Season 1 Episode 1 while the light beam on Harley continues off screen, her body is only drawn for the dimensions of the intended viewing area.

Each episode features a mini-game or puzzle which can be played while the clip downloads, as well as an interactive feature which allows viewers to help a character make a certain decision.

Other features of the website include downloadable trailers, screensavers, desktop backgrounds, internet chat buddy icons, as well as biographies of the characters, and an online version of the classic game Othello (aka Reversi) featuring the Gotham Girls. The screensavers, desktop backgrounds and internet chat buddy icon sites, however, no longer work, and simply redirect to the Warner Bros. website, as the Gotham Girls website also does.

The series lasted for three seasons (10 episodes each), with each episode released month-by-month.  While the first two seasons featured primarily comedic episodes, the third season attempted to make the show more serious.  These episodes linked directly to Batman & Mr. Freeze: SubZero. Dropping the magician Zatanna from its lineup and adding a host of new characters to the cast, including Detective Renee Montoya, each episode from this series tied into the next, forming a collective half-hour whodunit. The storyline also dealt with issues not seen since Batman: The Animated Series, such as the corruption of the Gotham City Police Department, Poison Ivy's environmental crusade and Commissioner Gordon's wavering faith in costumed superheroes. The series takes place in the DC animated universe.

The series finale "Cold Hands, Cold Heart" aired in 2002, wrapping up the mystery and ending the website. The final episode was dedicated to the memory of Hilary J. Bader, script writer for numerous DC Animated series, and who had died in 2002 of cancer. 

GothamGirls.com is no longer online, but the individual .swf files were still accessible until mid-2015. There is also a theory that when Dora fell into the chemicals, she turned into Killer Frost, They also have numerous similarities like the voice actor Jennifer Hale voiced both of them, but this is highly unlikely.

Episodes

Season 1 (2000) 
"The Vault"
"Lap Bat"
"Trick or Trick"
"A Little Night Magic"
"More Than One Way"
"Precious Birthstones"
"Pave Paradise"
"The Three Babes"
"The Gardener's Apprentice"
"Lady - X"

Season 2 (2001) 
"Hold That Tiger"
"Miss Un-Congeniality"
"Strategery"
"Baby Boom"
"Cat -n- Mouse"
"Bat'ing Cleanup"
"Catsitter"
"Gotham Noir"
"Scout's Dis-Honor"
"I'm Badgirl"

Season 3 (2002) 
"Ms.-ing in Action"
"Gotham in Pink"
"Hear Me Roar"
"Gotham in Blue"
"A Cat in the Hand"
"Jailhouse Wreck"
"Honor Among Thieves"
"No, I'm Batgirl"
"Signal Fires"
"Cold Hands, Cold Heart"

Cast 

 Arleen Sorkin – Dr. Harleen Quinzel / Harley Quinn
 Adrienne Barbeau – Selina Kyle / Catwoman, Renee Montoya
 Diane Pershing – Pamela Isley / Poison Ivy
 Tara Strong – Barbara Gordon / Batgirl
 Stacie Randall - Zatanna Zatara
 Jennifer Hale – Dora Smithy, Acting Commissioner Caroline Greenway, Detective Selma Reesedale
 Bob Hastings – Commissioner James Gordon
 Tom Kenny – WGBS Anchor, Rogue Cop, Additional Voices
 Dee Bradley Baker - Additional Voices

Comic series

DC Comics produced a five-issue Gotham Girls comic book miniseries in 2003, written by Paul Storrie. It starred Poison Ivy, Harley Quinn, Catwoman, Batgirl, with each issue spotlighting one of these characters to a certain degree. The story, which took place in the DC animated universe, involved a vial of chemicals that the three villainesses fought over, as they also tried to avoid capture by Batgirl and Detective Montoya. A three-issue miniseries, Batman: Harley and Ivy, followed the continued misadventures of Harley and Ivy.

Harley Quinn and the Gotham Girls (2012-02-12): includes Gotham Girls #1-5.

DVD release 
The complete Gotham Girls series was included as a bonus feature on the DVD release of the Birds of Prey television series, released by Warner Home Video on July 15, 2008. On the DVD, the animated episodes are presented in a linear fashion, with the interactive, decision-making option omitted.

References 

 Book references

External links 
 
 Gotham Girls @ The World's Finest
 Gotham Girls at DCAU Wiki

DC Animated Universe web series
2000 web series debuts
2002 web series endings
2000s American animated television series
Batman spin-off titles
DC Comics limited series
Comics based on television series
American animated web series
Catwoman in other media
Harley Quinn in other media
American flash animated web series
American children's animated comedy television series
American children's animated drama television series
American children's animated superhero television series
Animated superheroine television shows
Supervillain television shows
Transgender-related television shows
Television series by Warner Bros. Animation
Animated television shows based on DC Comics